Calixto is a given name. Notable people with the name include:

Calixto Bieito (born 1963), Spanish theater director known for "radical" interpretations of classic operas
Benedito Calixto (1853–1927), Brazilian painter
Renato Ribeiro Calixto (born 1988), Brazilian footballer
Calixto R. Catáquiz (born 1948), the incumbent mayor of San Pedro, Laguna, Philippines
Irineu Calixto Couto (born 1983), Brazilian footballer
Calixto García (1839–1898), general in three Cuban uprisings, part of the Cuban War for Independence
Calixto Leicea (1909–2004), Cuban musician
Calixto Oyuela (1857–1935), Argentine poet and essayist
Calixto Pérez (born 1949), retired boxer from Colombia
Calixto Bravo Villaso (1790–1878), Mexican colonel, a cousin of Nicolás Bravo
Calixto Zaldivar (1904–1979), Member of the House of Representatives of the Philippines

See also
Calixto, Cuba, a town in Las Tunas Province, Cuba
Calixto García, Cuba, a municipality in Holguín Province, Cuba
Calixto García Íñiguez Stadium, multi-use stadium in Holguín, Cuba
San Calixto, Colombian municipality located in the department of North Santander
Callisto, Ancient Greek mythology, nymph daughter of King Lycaon
Callisto, Astronomy. Third moon of Jupiter.

es:Calixto
pt:Calixto